Tanjidor is a traditional Betawi musical ensemble developed in Jakarta, Indonesia. This musical ensemble took form of a modest orchestra, and was developed in the 19th century, pioneered by Augustijn Michiels or better known as Major Jantje in the Citrap or Citeureup area on the outskirt of Batavia.

The instruments used are almost the same as a military band, a military-styled marching band and/or corps of drums/drum and bugle corps, usually consisting of select wind and percussion instruments. Other than Jakarta, tanjidor musical ensemble is also can be found in Pontianak, West Kalimantan.

Etymology

The term tanjidor was derived from Portuguese tanger (playing music) and tangedor (playing music outdoors), subsequently adopted in Betawi language as tanji (music).

Performance
Tanjidor music is commonly performed as a traditional street music as well as festive music in numbers of celebrations; such as the Cap go meh party in Betawi Chinese communities and Lebaran Betawi. Tanjidor bandsmen usually perform in traditional Betawi wedding to deliver the groom, or take part in parades as a group as a general rule, with the band led by a bandmaster or conductor. In general, tanjidor music is usually performed during festive occasions of the Betawi community. They wear uniforms inspired by traditional clothing of the Betawi of greater Jakarta and its suburban towns, with songkrok caps by the male bandsmen.

This form of musical ensemble is the remnant of the colonial marching band brass and wind instrument and music of the Dutch East Indies era in Indonesia. Their music is usually cheerful songs akin to military marches music from the Dutch colonial era, which were usually played by military bandsmen of the Royal Netherlands Navy and the Royal Netherlands East Indies Army, and later on by bandsmen of the first generation bands of the Indonesian National Armed Forces.

Instruments
There is no fixed numbers of instrument that can be used in the tanjidor band or ensemble. It can be as little as a brass duo of tuba and trumpet, to a quite complete wind orchestra consisting of numbers of wind and percussion instruments. The musical instruments being played in tanjidor among others are:

 Baritone
 Bass drum
 Clarinets
 including Bass clarinets
 Cornets
 Cymbals (Clash cymbals)
 Euphonium
 Flugelhorn
 Flute
 French horn
 Glockenspiel
 Helicon
 Mellophone

 Piccolo
 Snare drum 
 Sousaphone
 Saxophone
 Tenor drum
 Tenor horn
 Tuba
 Trombone
 including Valve trombones
 Trumpets

Played in concert settings:
 Cabasa
 Conga
 Drum kit
 Vibraphone
 Xylophone
 Tambourine
 Timbales
 Timpani
 Maracas
 Marimba
 Electric guitars
 Electronic keyboards

See also

Gambang kromong
Gamelan
Kulintang
Lenong
Talempong
Music of Indonesia

References

External links
Tanjidor Sorge Betawi (YouTube)

Indonesian styles of music
Types of musical groups
Betawi people
Music of Jakarta
Ethnomusicology
Indonesian words and phrases